The Sukhoi T-60S was a planned Soviet 1980s replacement for the Tu-22M3. The supersonic intermediate range bomber never got past the drawing board. Very little information is available about technical characteristics of this aircraft, which remains classified by the Sukhoi Design Bureau. It was believed that T-60S would have  featured a variable geometry wing, flat lifting fuselage and two engines, equipped with two-dimensional thrust vectoring nozzles. The armament was to include up to six Kh-101 cruise missiles, as well as AS-15 and AS-16 missiles, free-fall nuclear weapons and precision guided conventional munitions. The project was first initiated by  Sukhoi in 1984 but was cancelled in the early 1990s. The bomber was to have replaced the Tu-22M in the Soviet Air Force.

Instead, Sukhoi decided took a more conventional approach and developed the Su-34 as a replacement for the Tu-22M.

Technical performance characteristics (calculated) 
 Source  
  Crew:  n / d
  Length:  40 (38)
  Wingspan (Wings swept/unswept)  24 m / 37 m
  Height:  10 m
  Wing area:  n / d
  Mass empty:  32,000 kg
  Normal take-off weight:  85,000 kg
  Maximum take-off weight:  n / d
  Engines:  2 × turbofans n / a
  Thrust maximum:  2 × n / d
  Thrust on afterburner e:  2 × 23500 kgf

Flight performance (calculated) 
  'Maximum speed at height:'  M = 2.04
  'Cruising speed:'  M = 2.02
  'Maximum range without refueling:'  n / d
  'Practical range without refueling:'  6000 km
  'Fighting radius:'  2200 km
  'Duration flight a:'  n / d
  'Practical ceiling:'  20,000 m

See also

References

Abandoned military aircraft projects of the Soviet Union
1980s Soviet bomber aircraft
T-60S